Yevgeni Dmitrievich Mishakov (February 2, 1941 in Nikitkino, Russian SFSR – May 30, 2007 in Moscow, Russia) was an ice hockey player who played in the Soviet Hockey League. He played for HK Lokomotiv Moscow, SKA MVO Tver and HC CSKA Moscow, as well as briefly for football club Sputnik Kaluga. He was inducted into the Russian and Soviet Hockey Hall of Fame in 1968. He died in Moscow, Russia.

References

External links
 Russian and Soviet Hockey Hall of Fame bio

1941 births
2007 deaths
HC CSKA Moscow players
Olympic medalists in ice hockey
People from Yegoryevsk
Olympic gold medalists for the Soviet Union
Olympic ice hockey players of the Soviet Union
Ice hockey players at the 1968 Winter Olympics
Ice hockey players at the 1972 Winter Olympics
Burials in Troyekurovskoye Cemetery
Medalists at the 1972 Winter Olympics
Medalists at the 1968 Winter Olympics
FC Lokomotiv Kaluga players
Soviet footballers
Association football forwards
Sportspeople from Moscow Oblast